Nancye Lee Bertles AM ( Hayes; born January 1943), billed under her maiden name as Nancye Hayes, is an Australian actress, dancer, singer and choreographer/director and narrator.  She has been a leading figure in Australian musical theatre since the 1960s. Although her roles have been almost exclusively in theatre, she has briefly worked in television in series and mini-series, as a character actress including filling in for an Judy Nunn in the series Home and Away.

Early life 
Hayes grew up in the New South Wales's Sydney suburb of Manly and was an only child. At the age of seven, she had an operation to remove a growth in her hip joint, and the recovery included strapping her leg with irons. After her father died in a car crash when Hayes was eleven, her mother became a barmaid at the old Pacific Hotel in Manly.

She began dancing lessons at age nine at Hazel and Violet Meldrum's studio.  Hazel had been a choreographer for the leading Australian theatrical firm J. C. Williamson's.

Career 
Hayes at the aged of eighteen, left a job at a Sydney office to join the chorus of an Australian production of My Fair Lady. From 1963 she understudied or played small roles in productions such as the musical How to Succeed in Business Without Really Trying, My Fair Lady, Promises Promises,Hello, Dolly! and The Boys from Syracuse for J. C. Williamson's.  She also performed in Kiss Me, Kate, Brigadoon, Annie Get Your Gun and Little Me at the Menzies Theatre Restaurant in Sydney.

In 1967, Hayes received wide notice playing the title role in the original Australian cast of Sweet Charity.

Over the next thirty years, she performed leading roles in Australian casts of many musicals including Fastrada in Pippin (1974), Lily St. Regis in Annie (1978–1979), Roxie Hart in Chicago (1981–1982), Miss Adelaide in Guys and Dolls (1986–1987), Mrs Lovett in Sweeney Todd (1987), Liliane La Fleur in Nine (1987–1988) and Dorothy Brock in 42nd Street (1989–1993). She later played supporting roles including Aunt Eller in Oklahoma! (The Production Company, 2005), Mrs Higgins in My Fair Lady (Opera Australia, 2008), Madame Armfeldt in A Little Night Music (Opera Australia, 2009) and Edith Bouvier Beale in Grey Gardens (The Production Company, 2011).

Since the 1980s Hayes has also appeared in many Australian-written musicals.  These include Songs from Sideshow Alley (Classic Corporation, 1980), Variations (Nimrod Theatre, 1982), Summer Rain (Sydney Theatre Company, 1989), Jonah Jones (State Theatre Company of South Australia, 1991), Eureka! (Essgee, 2004) and Metro Street (STCSA, 2009).  She appeared in the Australian Broadcasting Corporation television special on Australian musicals Once In A Blue Moon and its soundtrack recording.

Her drama credits for Australia's major theatre companies and commercial producers include Born Yesterday, Danton's Death, Same Time, Next Year, Going Home, Dusa, Fish, Stas and Vi, The Glass Menagerie, Steel Magnolias, Stepping Out, and The Importance of Being Earnest.  Her cabaret show, Nancye with an E, toured Australia in 1992.  In 2006, she performed with Todd McKenney in his first non-musical role in the Ensemble Theatre's production of Six Dance Lessons in Six Weeks at the Playhouse Theatre in the Sydney Opera House.  It became the theatre's most successful play ever, and the pair re-united ten years later for another season along with Sandra Bates in her final directorial role.

Filmography 

TELEVISION

Screen roles 
Hayes was a fill-in for Judy Nunn, in the series Home and Away, whilst Nunn was unwell, briefly taking over her character of Ailsa Stewart. Other film and television roles include Elsie Curtin in The Last Bastion and secretary to Minister Rex Connor in The Dismissal. Roles in TV series include Consider Your Verdict, Carson's Law, Rafferty's Rules, G.P., Blue Heelers and House Husbands

Personal life 
Hayes is married to jazz saxophone musician and bandleader Bob Bertles, whom she met when he played in the band of Chicago, in which she starred.

Honour and awards 
She was appointed a Member of the Order of Australia (AM) on 26 January 2014 "for significant service to the performing arts, particularly musical theatre, as an actor, choreographer and director".  She had been previously granted a Medal of the Order of Australia (OAM) on 8 June 1981 "for service to the performing arts".

The Hayes Theatre in Potts Point, Sydney which has a focus on small-scale musical theatre and cabaret is named after her.

References 

Living people
1943 births
Australian musical theatre actresses
Helpmann Award winners
Members of the Order of Australia